Mikhail Maleyev (1899 – 23 February 1964) was a Soviet corps commander. 

He fought for the Bolsheviks in the civil war against the White movement and against Nazi Germany in the Second World War. 

He was a recipient of the Order of Lenin, Order of the Red Banner, Order of Suvorov, Order of Kutuzov and the Order of the Red Star. He retired at the age of 56.

References

1899 births
1964 deaths
Soviet military personnel of the Russian Civil War
Soviet military personnel of World War II
Soviet major generals
Recipients of the Order of Lenin
Recipients of the Order of the Red Banner
Recipients of the Order of Suvorov, 2nd class
Recipients of the Order of Kutuzov, 2nd class